Alex Cai (born August 30, 2000) is a Canadian fencer in the foil discipline. Cai has competed internationally for Canada since 2016 (junior) and from 2018 in the senior circuit.

Career 
At the 2019 Pan American Fencing Championships, in Toronto, Cai won silver as part of the team foil event.

Cai represented Canada at the 2020 Summer Olympics.

See also
List of Canadian sports personalities

References

External links
 

2000 births
Canadian male fencers
Living people
Sportspeople from Montreal
Olympic fencers of Canada
Fencers at the 2020 Summer Olympics